Harold Lee Nutter  CM, (29 December 1923 – 9 September 2017) was the 6th Bishop of Fredericton and later the 16th  Metropolitan of Canada.

He was born on December 29, 1923, educated at Mount Allison University  and  ordained Deacon in 1946 and Priest the following year. Later he held incumbencies in Simonds and Upham, Woodstock, New Brunswick then St Mark, Saint John, New Brunswick. In 1960 he was appointed Dean of Fredericton. Eleven years later he  became the area's diocesan and in 1980 metropolitan of his province- posts he held until 1989.

He died on September 9, 2017.

References

1923 births
2017 deaths
Mount Allison University alumni
Anglican bishops of Fredericton
20th-century Anglican Church of Canada bishops
Metropolitans of Canada
20th-century Anglican archbishops
Members of the Order of Canada
Deans of Fredericton